Saburo Hayakawa (April 8, 1888 – April 19, 1973) was a Japanese politician who served as governor of Hiroshima Prefecture from April 1936 to January 1937. He was born in Kanagawa Prefecture and graduated from the University of Tokyo. He was also governor of Saga Prefecture (1931–1933), Mie Prefecture (1933–1935), Kagoshima Prefecture (1935–1936) and Aichi Prefecture (1946).

1888 births
1973 deaths
Governors of Hiroshima
Japanese Home Ministry government officials
Governors of Saga Prefecture
Governors of Mie Prefecture
Governors of Kagoshima Prefecture
Governors of Aichi Prefecture
Japanese Police Bureau government officials
University of Tokyo alumni
Politicians from Kanagawa Prefecture